Wojciech Kowalczyk (born 14 April 1972) is a Polish retired footballer who played as a striker, currently working as a football expert.

The bulk of his professional career was spent with Legia Warsaw and in Spain. Early into his international career, he helped the Polish national team win the silver medal at the 1992 Summer Olympics.

Club career
Born in Warsaw, Kowalczyk played his youth football with local Olimpia and Polonez, joining country giants Legia Warsaw in 1990 at the age of 18. Almost from the very beginning, he was an automatic first-choice; in his weakest season, his first, he only appeared in 11 Ekstraklasa games, but was crucial in helping oust U.C. Sampdoria in the quarter-finals of the UEFA Cup Winners' Cup by scoring twice in Genoa for the 2–2 draw and qualification for the semifinals 3–2 on aggregate.

After having started the 1994–95 campaign with Legia (five matches, three goals, another league title), Kowalczyk moved abroad and signed with La Liga side Real Betis, but was never able to reproduce his previous form. He finished his five-year spell in Spain with UD Las Palmas in the second division, where he also appeared sparingly.

After almost one year out of football, Kowalczyk returned to his country and his main club, Legia. In late 2001 he changed countries again, joining Cyprus' Anorthosis Famagusta FC and netting a career-best 24 goals; after a nearly non-existent second season he finished his professional career in the same country, with APOEL FC, retiring at 32 – afterwards, he would play in amateur football until 2019, with AZS Absolwent UW Warsaw and Weszło Warsaw.

International career
Kowalczyk gained 39 caps for Poland, scoring 11 goals. His debut came at the age of 19 on 21 August 1991, against Sweden.

His biggest international highlight was helping the Olympic squad win silver at the 1992 Summer Olympics in Barcelona. He did not score at all in the group stage, but eventually ranked third in the charts at four, three behind compatriot Andrzej Juskowiak.

International goals
Scores and results table. Poland's goal tally first:

Later career
Following his retirement, Kowalczyk became a football expert. He worked for the Polsat Sport TV station. Since 2018, he has been publishing columns for the Weszło internet portal. He is also a participant of the Weszło TV's "Liga Minus" program, dealing with the topics of Ekstraklasa matches. He works for Kanał Sportowy.

Together with the sports journalist Krzysztof Stanowski, he wrote the book "Kowal. Prawdziwa historia" (Kowal. True story). It had its re-edition in 2021.

Personal life
His brother, Artur Kowalczyk, was also the player until he finished his career with Grom Lipowo in the 2013–14 season.

Honours

Club
Legia
Ekstraklasa: 1993–94, 1994–95, 2001–02
Polish Cup: 1993–94
Polish SuperCup: 1994

Anorthosis
Cypriot Cup: 2001–02

APOEL
Cypriot First Division: 2003–04

Country
Summer Olympic Games: Silver medal 1992

Individual
Cypriot First Division: Top Scorer 2001–02

References

External links

Betisweb stats and bio 
Poland stats at Eu-Football

1972 births
Living people
Footballers from Warsaw
Polish footballers
Association football forwards
Ekstraklasa players
Legia Warsaw players
La Liga players
Segunda División players
Real Betis players
UD Las Palmas players
KTS Weszło Warsaw players
Cypriot First Division players
Anorthosis Famagusta F.C. players
APOEL FC players
Poland international footballers
Olympic footballers of Poland
Footballers at the 1992 Summer Olympics
Olympic medalists in football
Medalists at the 1992 Summer Olympics
Olympic silver medalists for Poland
Polish expatriate footballers
Expatriate footballers in Spain
Expatriate footballers in Cyprus
Polish expatriate sportspeople in Spain